Stig Fredriksson (born 6 March 1956) is a Swedish former football defender. He played for IFK Göteborg during a large part of his career, winning two UEFA Cups (1982 and 1987), as well as four Swedish Championships with the club. He also played 56 matches for the national team, captaining 15 of them.

References

1956 births
Living people
Swedish footballers
Sweden international footballers
IFK Göteborg players
Allsvenskan players
Swedish football managers
UEFA Cup winning players
Association football defenders